Antenne Books is a distributor of independent art publishers.

Primarily working with emerging presses, Antenne Books acts as a distribution platform for small artist presses that exist outside the publishing mainstream. Their list includes publications by Ed Templeton, Kim Gordon, Harmony Korine and Ryan McGinley.

References

External links
Antenne Books
Article on Antenne Books by Homesapiens Magazine
Interview with Antenne Books on Magculture

Book publishing companies based in London